The 1985 Melbourne Cup was a two-mile handicap horse race which took place on Tuesday, 5 November 1985.

The 1985 Melbourne Cup was won by What A Nuisance a horse who had just recovered from a damaged suspensory ligament. This running of the race was notably for many reasons as it was the first horse race in Australia to have a prize pool of $AU1,000,000 and it was also the first time the Melbourne Cup was sponsored as it was sponsored by Foster's. Legendary commentator Bruce McAvaney called his first Melbourne Cup for Network 10, he would go on to call three more.

Field 

This is a list of horses which ran in the 1985 Melbourne Cup.

References

1985
Melbourne Cup
Melbourne Cup
1980s in Melbourne